Lotus Organizer is a discontinued personal information manager (PIM). It was initially developed by Threadz, a small British software house, reaching version 3.0. Organizer was subsequently acquired by Lotus Development Corporation, for whom the package was a Windows-based replacement for Lotus Agenda. For several years it was the unquestioned market leader until it was gradually overtaken by Microsoft Outlook.

Organizer is notable for using the ″leather-bound personal organizer″ graphical metaphor for its user interface. It is often bundled within Lotus SmartSuite.

Status
On 14 May 2013, IBM announced the immediate "withdrawal and discontinuance of support" of Lotus SmartSuite, Lotus Organizer and Lotus 123.

Version 6.1 was the last version. It supported Windows 2000, Windows XP, Windows Vista , Windows 7, and Windows 10.

Versions

Microsoft Windows
Organizer was a part of Lotus SmartSuite, but was also sold as a single application. The latest releases of SmartSuite did not include the current version of Organizer; it was sold separately only.

Versions up to 2 were 16-bit programs. Later versions are 32-bit programs.

IBM OS/2
The first OS/2 version was released in 1998. Until then, the Windows 16-bit version had been used. The last version is 1.7 from 2001. Later revisions of SmartSuite did not upgrade Organizer, although some fixes have been made.

Organizer for OS/2 uses the .or4 file format. This means that it cannot exchange data files with the later Windows versions, other than by importing and exporting data.

The features and user interface for Organizer for OS/2 are similar to that of Organizer 97 for Windows. It lacks later improvements, such as importing and exporting vCard and iCalendar files, and synchronisation with PDAs.

Mac OS
Lotus Organizer 97 GS was released for classic Mac OS in 1997 with features similar to the Windows version, including integration with Lotus Notes calendars and address books.

See also
 List of personal information managers

References

 Threadz Organizer 3.0 review by Newsbytes from June 5, 1992. Accessed 2006-08-08.
 Mention by Jack Schofield of The Guardian, January 10, 2002. Accessed 2006-08-08.
 IBM FAQ Technote last modified January 1, 2010. Accessed 2012-05-15.

External links
Lotus Organizer home page
Lotus SmartSuite home page
Lotus Organizer in SmartSuite Forum 
IBM Support Portal for Lotus SmartSuite
Unofficial support blog

Organizer
Organizer
OS/2 software
Personal information managers